Slant can refer to:

Bias 
Bias or other non-objectivity in journalism, politics, academia or other fields

Technical 
 Slant range, in telecommunications, the line-of-sight distance between two points which are not at the same level
Slant drilling (or Directional drilling), the practice of drilling non-vertical wells
 Slant height, is the distance from any point on the circle to the apex of a right circular cone

Automotive 
Slant-4 engine (disambiguation), a type of car engine
Triumph Slant-4 engine, an engine developed by Triumph
Chrysler Slant-6 engine, an engine developed by Chrysler
R40 (New York City Subway car), Slant version.

Publications 
Slant (journal), a Catholic journal
The Slant, a student humor magazine at Vanderbilt University
/ (novel) (or Slant), a book by science fiction writer Greg Bear
 Slant Magazine, a film, TV, and music review website
Slant (fanzine), a fanzine by Walt Willis, winner of the 1954 Retrospective Hugo Award for Best Fanzine
Slant Six Games, a video game developer founded in 2005

Bands 
The Slant (band), an American alternative rock band from Pittsburgh, Pennsylvania
Slant 6, an all-female punk rock trio based in Washington, D.C.
The Slants, an Asian dance/ rock group from Portland, Oregon

Other 

 A growth medium such as agar set in an inclined glass tube for growing microbiological cultures.
 Slant (route), an American football play pattern.
Slant (handwriting), an attribute of Western handwriting
 A racial slur for people of Asian descent, in reference to the shape of their eyes; see List of ethnic slurs
 Gokigen Naname, a logic puzzle also known as Slant.

See also
 Piccadilly Slant-Abraham's Cove, a designated place in the province of Newfoundland and Labrador